23 mm caliber is a specific size of popular autocannon ammunition.

This ammunition size has been widely used in many conflicts worldwide.  Examples of armaments using it are:
 23×115mm caliber, used on many Soviet and Russian airplanes
 23×122mm
 23×139mmSR
 23×152mmB caliber, used on Ilyushin Il-2 attack plane as well as on later Soviet anti-aircraft guns

See also
12.7×99mm
12.7×108mm
14.5x114
20 mm caliber
25×137mm
40 mm grenade
Bofors 40 mm gun
List of cartridges (weaponry), pistol and rifle

References